Mormolyce is a genus of ground beetles in the subfamily Lebiinae. They all possess distinctive violin-shaped elytra and live between layers of bracket fungi.

Species
The genus contains the following seven species:

 Mormolyce borneensis Gestro, 1875 — Indonesia
 Mormolyce castelnaudi Deyrolle, 1862 — Indonesia and Malaysia
 Mormolyce hagenbachi Westwood, 1862 — Indonesia and Malaysia
 Mormolyce matejmiciaki Ďuríček & Klícha, 2017 — Indonesia
 Mormolyce phyllodes Hagenbach, 1825 — Indonesia, Papua New Guinea, Malaysia, Thailand
 Mormolyce quadraticollis Donckier, 1899 — Indonesia
 Mormolyce tridens Andrewes, 1941 — Indonesia

References

External links
 
 
 Violin beetles on stamps

Lebiinae
Beetles of Asia